The Battle of Fukae Village (December 12, 1637) was the first recorded engagement of the Shimabara Rebellion. It was an early rebel victory against a punitive expedition sent from Shimabara Castle.

Prelude

Christianity in Japan 

The Portuguese, being the first European traders, arrived in Japan in 1543. The first Christian missionaries, the Jesuits led by Francis Xavier, arrived as early as 1549. In order to encourage trade with the Europeans, who brought luxury goods and firearms from India, some of the feudal lords in southwestern Japan allowed Christian missionaries and the construction of Catholic churches on their estates. As early as 1574, Lord Omura of Nagasaki converted to Christianity along with 60,000 of his subjects (under threat of exile) and burned the local Buddhist temples. In 1580, the Arima family, which ruled the nearby Shimabara Peninsula, also converted to Christianity, and Lord Bartolomeo Omura donated Nagasaki to the Catholic Church, making Nagasaki a semi-independent Jesuit colony in Japan. In 1582, on the west coast of Kyushu, another nobleman named Otomo Sorin converted to Christianity, and the Christian nobles of Kyushu sent a delegation of young Japanese Christians to the Pope, which sailed halfway around the world and was solemnly received at the court of King Philip II of Spain and Pope Sixtus V. As early as 1585, the area of Nagasaki, Shimabara and the nearby Amakusa Islands had 150,000 Christians, 200 Catholic churches and 85 priests, with a seminary in Shimabara teaching 100 students. In 1590, a delegation from Europe returned to Japan and brought the first printing press, which during 1591–1597 was put on the Amakusa Islands, and then in 1597–1606 in Nagasaki.

By the end of the 16th century, the number of Christians in Japan, from peasants to entire aristocratic families, reached almost half a million, mostly concentrated on the island of Kyushu. Further north the spread of Christianity encountered determined and organized resistance from Buddhist monasteries, clergy and believers.

Prohibition of Christianity in 1614 
The unification of Japan under Toyotomi Hideyoshi also brought new resistance to the spread of Christianity: the regent's edict of 1587 condemned the Christian destruction of Buddhist temples. In 1592, Hideyoshi began the invasion of Korea in which the Christian lords from Kyushu led by Konishi Yukinaga - also known by the Christian name of Augustine Konishi (lord of Amakusa Islands), accidentally or intentionally, was placed in the vanguard of the main army and suffered the heaviest losses. The open persecution of Christians began in 1596, when the Spanish galleon San Filipe with a cargo of silk from Manila ran aground on the coast of Shikoku Island: Hideyoshi's samurai seized the ship's cargo, whereupon the Spanish sailors openly threatened the Japanese that the invincible Armada of the Spanish king was behind them. Recognizing this as a direct threat of a Spanish invasion, Regent Hideyoshi declared all foreign missionaries as spies and in 1597, in Nagasaki, he ordered 26 Christians (6 Franciscans, 3 Jesuits and 17 Japanese converts) to be crucified in order to intimidate the rest and force them to give up their faith. Hideyoshi died in 1598, and the new government ended the persecution of Christians, but in a civil war that culminated in the Battle of Sekigahara (1600), Christian lords from western Japan fought for the defeated Western Army, and Konishi Yukinaga, the greatest Christian magnate, was executed after the battle together with Ishida Mitsunari.

Having established the new shogunate, Tokugawa Ieyasu ordered all samurai and nobles to reject Christianity and return to Buddhism: as early as 1606, Lord Sancho Omura, son of Bartolomeo Omura, took Nagasaki from the Jesuits, renounced Christianity and returned to Buddhism, together with all the surviving Christian lords on the island of Kyushu. A generation after the Battle of Sekigahara, Christianity became a secret, forbidden religion in Japan: all residents had to register at local Buddhist temples, and people suspected of secretly being Christians were forced by government officials to trample crosses and desecrate Christian relics, in order to publicly renounce their faith.

The former possessions of Augustine Konishi were divided among the new masters: those on Kyushu to the Hosokawa family (who renounced the Christian faith), and the Amakusa Islands to the Terazawa family: all Christian samurai were forced to sign a renunciation of their faith, under threat of exile and confiscation of their possessions. After the arrival of a delegation from the Catholic Philippines in 1614, which offered to establish trade and diplomatic relations, the new shogun Tokugawa Hidetada issued a new edict on February 1, 1614, which officially banned Christianity in Japan, expelled all Christians and Europeans from the country, including children from mixed marriages, with the exception of the Dutch (who as Protestants were happy to desecrate Catholic shrines, so in the eyes of the Japanese they were not considered Christians), and ordered an even harsher persecution and search for hidden Christians in Japan.

The situation in Shimabara 
A small number of Christians left Japan, and an even smaller number openly refused to submit and were punished by death, mostly by crucifixion. The example of these Japanese martyrs encouraged a considerable number of others, who kept their faith in secret. The lord of Shimabara at the time, Mihail Arima, tried to preserve his domain by renouncing his Christian faith, but he was transferred and his estates were assigned to Matsukura Shigemasa. On other domains as well, the authorities persistently searched for and punished hidden Christians: in June 1622, 55 Christian martyrs were crucified in Nagasaki, and a bunch of Jesuit books were burned.

The new lord of Shimabara was given two tasks by the shogun: to build a new castle and to eradicate hidden Christians on his estates. At enormous expense, borne by the local peasants, many of whom were former samurai of the Arima family who had lost their positions, the new Shimabara Castle was completed in 1624, and the previous seat of the estate, Hara Mountain Castle on the seashore, was abandoned. and partially demolished. During the construction of the castle, the already high taxes in rice were greatly increased, and exacted with reckless cruelty: peasants who did not pay the tax were roasted at the stake, and their wives and daughters were hung naked by their feet. However, when he visited the new shogun Tokugawa Yemitsu in 1624, Matsukura Shigemasa was severely reprimanded for not eradicating Christians from his estates, and was threatened with confiscation of his estates. Having thus returned from the shogun, Matsukura immediately ordered all Christians in Shimabara to report themselves: of the people who volunteered, about 150 were branded, mutilated by cutting off their fingers and exiled, and about 80 (among them 4 samurai) were executed by crucifixion, burning, or throwing into the hot volcanic springs of Mount Unzan after public torture, which was intended to force hidden Christians to renounce their faith. Part of the Christians, especially in the cities, renounced their faith, but in the villages the majority remained steadfast and retreated into secrecy. In 1529, Macakura was invited by the local authorities to persecute Christians in neighboring Nagasaki as well, but on the way back he died of a stroke, or was killed in a bathtub by his enemies.

The old master was succeeded by his inexperienced 27-year-old son Macakura Katsuye, who proved to be even more cruel and greedy than his father. Shimabara Domain was officially valued at 60,000 koku a year, but the young Matsukura raised the value of his estate to 120,000 koku on his own initiative, doubling the already heavy taxes in kind, demanding as much as 60% of the yield from the peasants. For non-payment of taxes, Matsukura's men tortured the debtors' wives and children. Harvests in 1629–1636. were bad, and the peasantry in Shimabara and the surrounding estates were starving, on the verge of survival: however, in 1637, Matsukura decided to mercilessly collect all back taxes for the past 7 years.

Rebellion 
The attempt by Matsukura's tax collectors in the fall of 1637 to collect all back taxes for 7 lean years brought the Shimabara peasantry to the breaking point. According to contemporary chronicles, the rebellion was started by the Christian ronin Peter Masuda (Masuda Yoshitsugu), a former samurai of Konishi Yukinaga, who was originally from the island of Oyano in the Amakusa archipelago and often visited his homeland, but lately lived in the village near Uto Castle, working as a farmer and a village elder, and five other ronin from Konishi's former army. Masuda's fifteen-year-old son Jeronim, famous for his wisdom throughout the region, was the formal leader of the rebellion. The authorities later claimed that they had misled and startled the common people on the Shimabara estate.

The first act of rebellion began in the very south of the Shimabara peninsula, in the village of Kuchinotsu, opposite the Amakusa archipelago: at the end of November 1637, the local tax collector arrested the pregnant daughter-in-law of the village chief and tortured her to death. In response, her father-in-law and her father (who was from the neighboring estate of Amakusa) rose to arms about 700 peasants (a significant part of them veterans from the wars with Korea and the Battle of Sekigahara) and burned down the tax collector's house. In their later reports to the shogun, Matsukura's officials emphasized the role of Christians in the rebellion, in order to cover up their abuses and violence against the peasants, however, most sources believe that it was primarily an uprising of oppressed and starving peasants against feudal tyranny. The uprising soon engulfed all the villages in the Shimabara Domain and on the neighboring domain, the Amakusa Islands, and the five ronin who led various groups of insurgents chose the young Christian preacher Jeronimo Amakusa (Amakusa Shiro), the son of one of the veterans who organized the uprising, as their leader. The only other insurgent leader whose name is confirmed in historical documents was Yamada Emonsaku (born around 1580), also a former samurai, Christian and sign-painter in the village where the rebellion began.

Battle 
At the time of the rebellion, the lord Matsakura Katsuie was in Edo, and his castellan Okamoto Shinbei, who remained in charge of the estate, reacted slowly. It was not until the evening of December 11 that news of the rebellion and the killing of officials in some villages reached Shimabara Castle: allegedly, while trying to remove a Christian icon from the wall, a local official was killed by a crowd of rebels who had gathered in the village of Fukae. Castellan sent a detachment of 300 infantrymen, 80 arquebusiers and 15 samurai on horseback against them. Although expecting an easy victory over the peasants, Matsukura's samurai were attacked on the road at dawn on December 12 by over 1,000 rebels: many of them were veterans of previous wars, some even carrying arquebuses. Many rebels were dressed in white, with crosses drawn on their foreheads and they attacked with the battle cry of Santiago, imitating the Portuguese. After a short fight, Matsukura's squad was forced to flee, losing 100 infantrymen and 5-6 samurai; the rebels had about 20 dead.

Aftermath 
Emboldened by the influx of new groups, the rebels, whose number had grown to 1,500 fighters, pursued their opponents all the way to the gates of Shimabara Castle, where they lost about 200 men in a short skirmish, but burned and looted the suburbs (including Buddhist temples) and besieged the castle, chasing defenders behind the walls. On the same day, a riot broke out on the neighboring domain in all the villages on the Amakusa Islands, where the Christians took up arms in an organized manner and burned down Buddhist temples. The total number of insurgents swelled to 8,000 in a few days, as many peasants were forced to join them to avoid the rebels burning their homes.

References 

Conflicts in 1637
17th-century rebellions
Rebellions in Japan
History of Christianity in Japan
1637 in Japan
Battles involving Japan
17th-century military history of Japan
Coordinates on Wikidata